Claudio Adrián Fernández Leal (born 30 January 1977) is a Uruguayan football manager and former player who played as a forward.

Playing career
Born in Montevideo, Fernández represented Albion, Liverpool Montevideo, Salus, Uruguay Montevideo, Progreso, Sud América and Deportivo Maldonado.

Managerial career
After retiring, Fernández began his managerial career with Oriental. In July 2016, he took over Villa Teresa, but left the following January.

In May 2017, Fernández was named in charge of Cerro Largo, but was dismissed in November. On 25 January of the following year, he returned to Villa Teresa.

On 26 July 2019, Fernández was appointed manager of Sud América, but left the following February. He returned to Villa Teresa for a third spell shortly after, before being named in charge of Cerrito on 15 January 2022.

Fernández resigned from Cerrito on 11 April 2022.

References

External links

1977 births
Living people
Footballers from Montevideo
Uruguayan footballers
Association football forwards
Albion F.C. players
Liverpool F.C. (Montevideo) players
Uruguay Montevideo players
C.A. Progreso players
Sud América players
Uruguayan football managers
Uruguayan Primera División managers
Uruguayan Segunda División managers
Cerro Largo F.C. managers
Sud América managers
Club Sportivo Cerrito managers
Juventud de Las Piedras managers